Tyshawn Abbott (born August 19, 1988 in Phoenix, Arizona) is an American former professional basketball player who last played for the Rayos de Hermosillo of the CIBACOPA. He had played college basketball at Arizona State.

High school career
Abbott played high school basketball at Desert Vista in Phoenix.

He averaged 17.3 points per game in his senior year leading Desert Vista to a 29–2 overall record and a 5A Division I semifinal appearance and averaged 17 points and nine boards in junior season as team was 26–7.

College career
Abbott played college basketball for Sun Devils men's basketball at Arizona State University from 2007 to 2011.

Professional career
After going undrafted in the 2011 NBA draft, Abbott joined Kalev/Cramo of the Estonian League. He led his team at two league championships during the two years that he stayed at the team.

On September 18, 2014, he signed with Fulgor Libertas Forlì. On December, Abbott left Forlì and joined Eskişehir Basket of the Turkish Basket League until the end of the season. On January 28, 2015, Abbott joined Nea Kifissia of the Greek Basket League.

The next season, he signed in Italy with Pallacanestro Chieti of the Serie A2. On December 4, 2015, he joined Universo Treviso replacing La'Marshall Corbett on the team's squad.

On December 22, 2016, he signed until the end of the season with the Greek team Doxa Lefkadas of the Greek Basket League.

On October 23, 2017, Abbott signed with the Delaware 87ers of the NBA G League, where he averaged 6.3 points, 1.7 rebounds and 2.1 assists in 39 games. After the season ended, he signed with Rayos de Hermosillo of the Mexican CIBACOPA on March 16, 2018.

References

External links
 FIBA game center profile
 Eurobasket.com profile
Espn.com Profile

1988 births
Living people
American expatriate basketball people in Estonia
American expatriate basketball people in Greece
American expatriate basketball people in Italy
American expatriate basketball people in Mexico
American expatriate basketball people in Turkey
American men's basketball players
Arizona State Sun Devils men's basketball players
Basketball players from Phoenix, Arizona
BC Kalev/Cramo players
Doxa Lefkadas B.C. players
Eskişehir Basket players
Korvpalli Meistriliiga players
Nea Kifissia B.C. players
Rayos de Hermosillo players
Shooting guards
Universo Treviso Basket players